The longnose puffer (Sphoeroides lobatus) is a species in the family Tetraodontidae, or pufferfishes. It occurs in shallow coastal waters of the Eastern Pacific from California to Chile, including the Galapagos Islands.

References

External links
 

Tetraodontidae
Western American coastal fauna
longnose puffer